Piktochart is a web-based graphic design tool and infographic maker.

History
The idea of Piktochart was born in 2011 and a minimum viable product began developing.

In March 2012, the first iteration of Piktochart was launched by co-founders, Goh Ai Ching and Andrea Zaggia in Penang, Malaysia. By the end of the same year, Piktochart grew its user base to more than 170,000 users and received a $140,000 grant from the Malaysian government’s Cradle Fund, as well as announcing that it had raised seed funding from a number of investors. 

Its userbase grew with the addition of new formats such as reports, banners and presentations which resulted in more than 3 million users in mid-2015.

As of 2018, Piktochart has been used by more than 11 million people worldwide and has grown to become a semi-distributed team of 53 team members with the office based in Penang.

Features

Whereas companies like Lucid Software, Inc, Trendalyzer, Gliffy and others had previously focused on data-representation tools that would be useful for intra-corporate collaboration as aids to speeches and presentations, and for the creation of internal communications documents, Piktochart described itself as focused on empowering users to create infographics that would be web-publisher ready and able to stand alone as a piece of multimedia content.  Piktochart provides over 600 templates which users can edit, or by using more advanced functions, customize as desired.

The current version of Piktochart, released in 2017, includes a HTML publisher which allows users to create visuals that can be viewed online or embedded to a website, as well as allowing the user to include multiple interactive elements such as charts, videos, map visualization, and animated icons.

See also
Infographics
Data Visualization

References

External links

Graphics software
Diagramming software
Technical communication tools
Cloud applications
Collaborative software
Web applications
2012 software
Online companies of Malaysia
2012 establishments in Malaysia
Malaysian brands
Internet properties established in 2012
Companies based in Penang